The 11th Pan American Games were held in Havana, Cuba from August 2 to August 18, 1991.

Medals

Gold

Women's 100 m Backstroke: Silvia Poll

Bronze

Men's 20000 m: Guillermo Mata

See also
Costa Rica at the 1992 Summer Olympics

Nations at the 1991 Pan American Games
P
Costa Rica at the Pan American Games